The 2008–09 Oregon State Beavers men's basketball team represented Oregon State University in National Collegiate Athletic Association (NCAA) Division I men's basketball during the 2008–09 season. Playing in the Pacific-10 Conference (Pac-10) and led by first-year head coach Craig Robinson, the Beavers finished the season with a 18–18 overall record and won the 2009 College Basketball Invitational. It was Oregon State's first-ever postseason tournament championship.

In Pac-10 play, the Beavers finished in eighth place with a 7–11 record. They lost in the first round of the 2009 Pac-10 tournament to Stanford, 62–54.

Roster

Schedule and Results
Sources:

Schedule 

|-
!colspan=9 style=| Exhibition

|-
!colspan=9 style=| Regular season

|-
!colspan=9 style=| Pac-10 tournament

|-
!colspan=9 style=| CBI

References

Oregon State Beavers men's basketball seasons
Oregon State
College Basketball Invitational championship seasons
Oregon State
Oregon State Beavers Men's Basketball Team
Oregon State Beavers Men's Basketball Team